ONoffON is the second studio album by American post-punk band Mission of Burma. It was released on May 4, 2004 by Matador Records, marking the band's first studio recording after a nineteen-year hiatus.

Track listing
 "The Setup" – 3:08
 "Hunt Again" – 2:16
 "The Enthusiast" – 3:37
 "Falling" – 4:00
 "What We Really Were" – 4:11
 "Max Ernst's Dream" – 3:31
 "Fake Blood" – 3:32
 "Prepared" – 3:02
 "Untitled" – 0:15
 "Wounded World" – 3:29
 "Dirt" – 3:45
 "Into the Fire" – 3:40
 "Fever Moon" – 3:47
 "Nicotine Bomb" – 3:16
 "Playland" – 2:32
 "Absent Mind" – 5:21

A special track, "Class War" (the Dils cover), was included on the double LP version of the album.

Personnel
Mission of Burma
 Clint Conley - bass, guitar, vocals
 Peter Prescott - drums, percussion, sampling, vocals
 Roger Miller - guitars, keyboards, percussion, vocals, string arrangement
 Bob Weston - tape, loops

References

External links 
 

2004 albums
Mission of Burma albums
Matador Records albums